Uraeginthus is a genus of small seed-eating birds in the family Estrildidae that are found in Sub-Saharan Africa.

The genus was introduced by the German ornithologist Jean Cabanis in 1851. The type species was subsequently designated as the red-cheeked cordon-bleu. The name Uraeginthus combines the Ancient Greek words oura "tail" and aiginthos for an unknown bird, perhaps a finch.

It contains the following three species:

References

 
Bird genera
Estrildidae
Waxbills
 
Taxonomy articles created by Polbot